Isaac "Ike" Bird (14 August 1895 – 22 June 1984) was an English footballer who made eight appearances in the Football League playing for Lincoln City as an inside left. He also played for Lincoln in the Midland League, and for Ilkeston United in the Central Alliance.

References

1895 births
1984 deaths
People from Kimberley, Nottinghamshire
Footballers from Nottinghamshire
English footballers
Association football inside forwards
Lincoln City F.C. players
English Football League players
Midland Football League players
Place of death missing
Ilkeston United F.C. players